Marin Grujević (born 9 March 1994) is a Croatian professional footballer who plays as a right back for Opatija in the Croatian Second Football League.

References

External links

1991 births
Living people
Footballers from Rijeka
Association football fullbacks
Croatian footballers
HNK Rijeka players
NK Grobničan players
NK Pomorac 1921 players
NK Novigrad players
NK Istra 1961 players
NK Rudeš players
NK Opatija players
Croatian Football League players
First Football League (Croatia) players
Second Football League (Croatia) players